The history of Anarchism in Estonia dates back to the Russian Revolution, seeing a resurgence after the Singing Revolution.

History
In September 1917, the Anarchist Communist Youth Association of Narva was founded in Narva. It established libraries, autonomous groups, choirs and an orchestra for young anarcho-communists to participate in.

In the 1970s, the anarchist movement re-emerged in the Estonian Soviet Socialist Republic, as part of the Estonian punk subculture. The Singing Revolution, which brought an end to Soviet rule in the Baltic states and saw the return of freedom of expression, allowed for the complete re-organization of the anarchist movement. This first took form on May 10, 1995, with the foundation of the "Anarchist League of Estonia" (MAL) by a group of individualist anarchists. This was followed on May 1, 1999, by the Fraternitas Anarchensis Corporation (KFA), on April 30, 2002, by the Estonian Anarchist Party (EAP) and on February 22, 2006, by RedBlack (PM).

See also 
 Estonian punk
 Socialism in Estonia

References 

 
Anarchism
Estonia